Dowreh Rural District is a rural district (dehestan) in Chegeni District, Dowreh County, Lorestan Province, Iran. At the 2006 census, its population was 9,208, in 2,052 families.  The rural district has 38 villages.

References 

Rural Districts of Lorestan Province
Dowreh County